Liphakoe Football Club is a football club based in Moyeni, Quthing District, Lesotho. The club play in the Lesotho Premier League.

History 
The club were established in the 1940s and played in the Lesotho Premier League in the 1980s, 1990s and early 2000s before being relegated in 2002. In 2013–14 the club finished as runners-up in the Southern stream of the A Division, narrowly missing out on promotion to the Premier League. However, they won the Top 8 championship, beating Roma Boys 3–2 in the final. The 2014–15 season saw the club won the Southern stream of the A Division, earning promotion to the Premier League.

Current squad

Honours 
A Division
Northern Stream champions 2014–15
Top 8 champions 2013–14

References

External links 

Lesotho Premier League clubs